The 2018–19 Antigua and Barbuda Premier Division was the 48th season of the Antigua and Barbuda Premier Division, the top division football competition in Antigua and Barbuda. The season began on 27 October 2018.

Liberta were the champions.

Clubs

League table

References

External links 

 Official website 

1
Antigua and Barbuda
Antigua and Barbuda Premier Division seasons